Ricardo Emídio Ramalho Silva (born 26 September 1975) is a Portuguese retired professional footballer who played as a central defender.

He amassed Primeira Liga totals of 264 matches and 16 goals during 15 seasons, representing in the competition Porto, Marítimo, União de Leiria, Vitória de Guimarães, Boavista, Beira-Mar and Vitória de Setúbal.

Club career
A Boavista F.C. youth graduate who was born in Porto, Silva was bought in 1995 by neighbouring FC Porto, where he would be loaned constantly during his contract, mostly to mid-table clubs in the Primeira Liga, his beginnings being with AD Esposende in the third level. From 1999 to 2002 he was part of the club's first-team, but his starting XI opportunities were rare; for the 2002–03 season he was loaned for the fifth and last time, to Vitória de Guimarães.

In the summer of 2003, Silva returned to Boavista where he knew his most steady period, playing there for four out of five campaigns (2004–05 was spent at S.C. Beira-Mar, also in the top flight). Although almost never an undisputed starter, he did figure prominently.

In February 2008, Silva left Boavista and moved to Russia with FC Shinnik Yaroslavl, being signed at the same time as compatriot Bruno Basto (from C.D. Nacional). In late December 2009 the 34-year-old agreed on a return to his country, signing with struggling Vitória F.C. until the end of the season, with the Sadinos eventually finishing in 14th position, the first team above the relegation zone.

Honours
Porto
Taça de Portugal: 1999–2000, 2000–01

References

External links

Shinnik official profile 

1975 births
Living people
Footballers from Porto
Portuguese footballers
Association football defenders
Primeira Liga players
Liga Portugal 2 players
Segunda Divisão players
FC Porto players
A.D. Esposende players
F.C. Felgueiras players
C.S. Marítimo players
U.D. Leiria players
FC Porto B players
Vitória S.C. players
Boavista F.C. players
S.C. Beira-Mar players
Vitória F.C. players
Padroense F.C. players
Russian Premier League players
FC Shinnik Yaroslavl players
Portugal under-21 international footballers
Portuguese expatriate footballers
Expatriate footballers in Russia
Portuguese expatriate sportspeople in Russia